Thomas Jerome Bliley Jr. (born January 28, 1932) is an American Republican politician and former U.S. Representative from the commonwealth of Virginia.

Background
Bliley was born on January 28, 1932, in Chesterfield County, Virginia. He attended Catholic schools and graduated in 1948 at the age of 16 from Benedictine High School.

In 1952, Bliley earned a B.A. in Political Science from Georgetown University in Washington, D.C. He subsequently served as a lieutenant in the U.S. Navy from 1952 to 1955. He worked as a funeral director for Joseph W. Bliley Co. Funeral Home, a family business, eventually serving as President.

Bliley, a practicing Roman Catholic, is married to the former Mary Virginia Kelley and is the father of two Mary Vaughan Bliley Davies and Thomas Jerome Bliley III. He has five grandchildren, 2 granddaughters Jennifer and Mary Kathryn Davies, 2 grandsons Thomas Jerome Bliley IV and Shawn Bliley and 1 step-grandson Joseph Utter III, two great-grandsons 
Christian and Aiden Davies and one great-granddaughter.

Political career
In 1968, Bliley was elected vice-mayor of Richmond. He held that post until 1970, when he successfully ran for mayor, a position he held until 1977. Bliley grew up as a conservative Southern Democrat, but became a Republican after his term as mayor.

In 1980, Bliley won the Republican nomination for Congress representing Virginia's 3rd congressional district after 12-year incumbent David Satterfield announced his retirement. He won with 52 percent of the vote, becoming the first Republican to win an undisputed victory in the district since Reconstruction. (In 1890, the House awarded Republican Edmund Waddill the seat after a disputed election.)

The 3rd, however, had been trending Republican for some time at the national level. It had been one of the first areas of Virginia where the old Byrd Democrats started splitting their tickets and voting Republican in presidential elections. As a result, it had not supported a Democrat for president since 1948, and had actually come close to electing a Republican twice in the 1960s, with the Democrats only surviving by less than 1,000 votes. However, conservative Democrats continued to hold most local offices, as well as most of the district's seats in the General Assembly, well into the 1980s.

Bliley would never face another contest anywhere near as close as his first one. He was reelected five times from the 3rd with little difficulty, only facing an independent in 1984 and running completely unopposed in 1988. After the 1990 census, the Democratic-controlled Virginia General Assembly began the process of redistricting the state. It was faced with a Justice Department order to create a majority-black district in order to comply with the Voting Rights Act. The legislature responded by shifting most of Richmond, which by this time had a black majority, into a new, majority-black 3rd district. Bliley's district was renumbered the 7th, and retained most of the whiter and wealthier sections of Richmond, along with several suburbs. Bliley now represented one of the most Republican districts in Virginia and the South, and he was handily reelected to four more terms, retiring in January 2001. Indeed, at the time the 7th was so heavily Republican that after it was redrawn in 1992, Bliley only faced a Democrat once, in 1996.

In 1995, when the Republican Party gained majority control of the Congress, Bliley was elected Chairman of the House Commerce Committee, a position he held for six years. He was a principal author of several important laws including the Telecommunications Act of 1996, the Food and Drug Administration Modernization Act of 1997, the Private Securities Litigation Reform Act and the Financial Services Modernization Act of 1999, also known as the "Gramm-Leach-Bliley Act".

Elections
1980; Bliley was elected to the U.S. House of Representatives with 52% of the vote, defeating Democrat John A. Mapp, Independent Howard Hearnes Carwile, and Libertarian James B. Turney.
1982; Bliley was re-elected with 59% of the vote, defeating Democrat John A. Waldrop.
1984; Bliley was re-elected with 86% of the vote, defeating Independent Roger L. Coffey.
1986; Bliley was re-elected with 67% of the vote, defeating Democrat Kenneth E. Powell and Independent J. Stephens Hodges.
1988; Bliley was re-elected unopposed.
1990; Bliley was re-elected with 66% of the vote, defeating Democrat Jay Starke and Independent Rose L. Simpson.
1992; Bliley was re-elected with 83% of the vote, defeating Independent Gerald E. Berg.
1994; Bliley was re-elected with 84% of the vote, defeating Independent Berg.
1996; Bliley was re-elected with 75% of the vote, defeating Democrat Roderic H. Slayton and Independent Bradley E. Evans.
1998; Bliley was re-elected with 79% of the vote, defeating Independent Evans.

References

External links

 

1932 births
Living people
Catholics from Virginia
Mayors of Richmond, Virginia
People from Chesterfield County, Virginia
Military personnel from Virginia
Richmond, Virginia City Council members
American funeral directors
United States Navy officers
Georgetown College (Georgetown University) alumni
Republican Party members of the United States House of Representatives from Virginia
Members of Congress who became lobbyists